The Yoke's on Me is a 1944 short subject directed by Jules White starring American slapstick comedy team The Three Stooges (Moe Howard, Larry Fine and Curly Howard). It is the 79th entry in the series released by Columbia Pictures starring the comedians, who appeared in 190 shorts at the studio between 1934 and 1959.

Plot
The Stooges try to join the army but are labeled 4-F by the draft board due to Curly having water on the knee. After they decide to go on vacation until a job comes along, their father (Robert McKenzie) insists they aid the war effort instead by becoming farmers. Inspired, the trio sell their dilapidated car and buy an equally dilapidated farm. The farm contains no livestock except for one chicken and two geese, one adult male, and a baby goose that Curly helps out of a hole by filling it with water from a hose. The boys then spot some pumpkins and decide to carve and sell them. Meanwhile a police officer tells the farmer that sold the stooges the farm some Japanese-Americans escaped from a prison camp, and that an ostrich escapes from a Circus.

In the interim, the escaped Japanese-Americans from the prison camp (known during World War II as relocation centers), and work their way onto the Stooges' farm. Curly is the first to notice some suspicious activity (one of the escapees places a carved pumpkin on his head, spooking Curly). Eventually, Moe and Larry believe him, and realize that the farm is surrounded by the Japanese-Americans (whom they mistake for Japanese invaders). Moe then throws an ostrich egg (laden with digested gunpowder) at the escapees, killing them.

Cast

Credited

Production notes
The Yoke's on Me was filmed on November 8–12, 1943. The film's title is a pun on the expression, "the joke's on me."

Controversy
During World War II, the Stooges released several comedies that engaged in propaganda against the then-enemy Japanese, including Spook Louder, No Dough Boys, Booby Dupes and The Yoke's on Me. The Yoke's on Me is especially singled out by contemporary critics. For many years, the film was blacklisted by some television stations, due to its humorous treatment of Japanese American escapees from a relocation center (the Japanese characters in question are not POWs).

Author Jon Solomon has said, "no Stooge film so profoundly disturbs modern viewers as this one." Author Michael Fleming put it more bluntly: "Knowing what we do now about how Japanese-born American citizens were mistreated and stripped of their belongings in relocation centers makes this as funny as a train wreck."

Quotes
Curly: "Look, look! A pelican!"
Moe: "That's no pelican, it's a gander."
Curly: "Mahatma gander?"
Moe: "No, a gander, a gander! A goose's husband."
Larry: "Yeah, a papa goose."
Curly: "Do they have papa gooseses and mama gooseses?"
Larry: "Oh sure. And little baby gooseses, too."
Curly: "Oh, I read about them. They come from Germany...the goosetapo!"

References

External links 
 
 
The Yoke's on Me at threestooges.net

1944 films
The Three Stooges films
American black-and-white films
1944 comedy films
Cultural depictions of Adolf Hitler
American World War II propaganda shorts
Films directed by Jules White
Columbia Pictures short films
1940s English-language films
1940s American films